Mohamed Younis (Arabic: محمد يونس; 30 October 1979) is an Egyptian footballer. He currently plays as a defender for the Egyptian Premier League club Al-Ittihad Al-Sakndary.

After spending 5 years in ENPPI and becoming the team's captain, Younis left the club in 2007 and went to El-Masria Lalettesalat.

Mohamed joined Zamalek from El-Masria Lalettesalat in July 2010 as a free agent.

After failing to make an impression with Zamalek, Younis was sold to Petrojet during the 2011 Summer transfers.

References

External links
 

Living people
Egyptian footballers
Association football forwards
1979 births
Ismaily SC players
ENPPI SC players
Zamalek SC players
Al Ittihad Alexandria Club players
Egyptian Premier League players